Confession of a Child of the Century is a 2012 historical drama film written and directed by Sylvie Verheyde, based on Alfred de Musset's 1836 autobiographical novel of the same name. The film competed in the Un Certain Regard section of the 2012 Cannes Film Festival. In spite of its selection to the festival, the film gained notoriety as being the lowest-grossing US theatrical release of 2015; it earned US$74 from its one-week, one-theater theatrical run.

Cast
 Charlotte Gainsbourg as Brigitte
 Pete Doherty as Octave
 Lily Cole as Elise
 August Diehl as Desgenais
 Volker Bruch as Henri Smith
 Joséphine de La Baume as Desgenais's mistress
 Guillaume Gallienne as Mercanson
 Rebecca Jameson as voice over
 Effi Rabsilber as Cantatrice
 Rhian Rees as Madame Levasseur
 Karole Rocher as Marco

Production
Pete Doherty, who worked primarily as a musician, was obsessed with Charlotte Gainsbourg because of the legacy surrounding her famous father, French musician Serge Gainsbourg. During press for the film, he alleged that he and Gainsbourg had had a fling after filming and she had briefly abandoned her partner Yvan Attal and moved from Paris to London in order to be with him.

References

External links
 
 
 

2012 films
2012 romantic drama films
2010s English-language films
2010s historical drama films
2010s historical romance films
Arte France Cinéma films
British historical drama films
British historical romance films
British romantic drama films
English-language French films
English-language German films
Films based on autobiographies
Films based on French novels
Films based on works by Alfred de Musset
Films set in 1830
Films set in the 1830s
Films set in Paris
Films shot in Bavaria
Films shot in Paris
French historical drama films
French historical romance films
French romantic drama films
German historical drama films
German historical romance films
German romantic drama films
Films directed by Sylvie Verheyde
2010s British films
2010s French films
2010s German films